"One Day at a Time (Em's Version)" is a song by American rapper Tupac from the 2003 soundtrack album Tupac: Resurrection: The Original Soundtrack. The track is American rapper Eminem's take on the 1996 original, which features both Shakur and Spice 1. Eminem's version features vocals from both himself and Outlawz. The song was released as a 12" promo single in 2004, no official music video was ever created. It charted at #80 on The Billboard Hot 100 and number 55 in the RNB chart and 22 in rap singles. It also peaked at 134 in the UK.

Critical reception
Allmusic wrote positively: "For one, she (Afeni Shakur) outsources the new productions to a trustworthy producer on a hot streak, Eminem, who works his magic on a trio of tracks: "Ghost," the powerful album opener; "One Day at a Time (Em's Version)," a thoughtful posse track with Em and the Outlawz." Rapreviews was also proud: "Eminem takes a far more direct role on his revision of the Outlawz song "One Day at a Time," adding a verse of his own to the song."

Track listing

Charts

References

Tupac Shakur songs
Songs released posthumously
2004 singles
Eminem songs
Songs written by Eminem
Song recordings produced by Eminem
Gangsta rap songs
2003 songs
Songs written by Tupac Shakur
Interscope Records singles